Cubango may refer to the following places and jurisdictions :

 Okavango River
 Cuando Cubango Province in Angola
 the Apostolic Prefecture of Lower Congo in Cubango, former Catholic missionary jurisdiction
 the former Catholic Apostolic Prefecture of Cubango in Angola (originally (Upper) Cimbebasia (in Portuguese Angola)), suppressed into the Diocese of Nova Lisboa)
 Cubango, Niterói, a neighborhood Niteroi city, Rio de Janeiro (state), Brazil